Armutlia may refer to several places in Romania:

 Turda, a village in Mihai Bravu commune, Tulcea County
 Periș, a former village in Independența commune, Constanța County